Marsh is an English surname which derived from the Norman French word 'Marche' meaning boundary, and was brought to England after the Norman Conquest.

People
Abigail Marsh, American psychologist and researcher
Adam Marsh (c. 1200–1259), English Franciscan, scholar and theologian
Adrian Marsh (born 1978), English cricketer
Albert L. Marsh (1877–1944), American metallurgist 
Albert Marsh (Medal of Honor recipient) (died 1895), U.S. Medal of Honor recipient
Anna Marsh (died 1834), established the Vermont Asylum of the Insane
Anne Marsh-Caldwell (1791–1874), English novelist
Arno Marsh (1928–2019), American jazz musician
Arthur Hardwick Marsh (1842–1909), English painter and watercolorist
B. J. Marsh (1940–2020), American politician
Billy Marsh (1917–1995), British theatrical agent
Brad Marsh (born 1958), Canadian professional ice hockey player
Brandon Marsh (baseball) (born 1997), American professional baseball player
Carol Marsh (1926–2010), British film actress
Charles Marsh (disambiguation), several people
Clifton E. Marsh (born 1946), American author, sociologist and educator
Danielle Marsh (born 2004), Korean-Australian singer-songwriter and member of South Korean girl group NewJeans
Dan Marsh, Canadian professional wrestling referee and wrestler
Dave Marsh (born 1950), American music critic
David Marsh (disambiguation), several people
D. E. Marsh (1862–1933), English Locomotive Superintendent
Edward Marsh (disambiguation), several people
Frank Lewis Marsh (1899–1992), American biologist
Fred Marsh (1924–2006), American baseball player
Gary Marsh, Disney Channel executive
Geoff Marsh (born 1958), Australian cricketer and coach
George Marsh (disambiguation), several people
George Perkins Marsh (1801–1882), American philologist and diplomat
Graham Marsh (born 1944), Australian professional golfer
Helene Marsh (born 1945), Australian marine biologist
Henry Marsh (athlete) (born 1954), American steeplechase athlete
Herbert Marsh (1757–1839), Church of England Bishop
Howard Marsh (died 1969), Broadway tenor
Hugh Marsh (born 1955), Canadian violinist
James Marsh (disambiguation), several people
Jean Marsh (born 1934), English actress
Jem Marsh (1930–2015), British engineer and racing car driver
Jesse Marsh (1907–1966), American comic book and animation artist
JJ Marsh (born 1966), Swedish guitarist and composer
Joan Marsh (1913–2000), American actress
Jodie Marsh (born 1978), British glamour model and reality TV star
John Marsh (disambiguation), several people
Jonathan Marsh (1621–1672), founding settler of the New Haven Colony, and of Norwalk, Connecticut
Keith Marsh (1926–2013), English actor
Kyal Marsh (born 1987), Australian actor
Kym Marsh (born 1976), English actress and singer
Linda Marsh (born 1939), American actress
Lou Marsh (1879–1936), Canadian athlete and sports journalist
Mae Marsh (1894–1968), American actress
Marian Marsh (1913–2006), Trinidad-born American actress
Matthew Marsh (disambiguation), several people
Melissa Marsh (born 1985), Australian basketball player
Michael Marsh (athlete) (born 1967), American sprinter
Michael Marsh (journalist), American television news anchor
Michele Marsh (disambiguation), several people
Michelle Marsh (model) (born 1982), British glamour model 
Mike Marsh (disambiguation), several people
Mitchell Marsh (born 1991), Australian cricketer
Narcissus Marsh (1638–1713), English clergyman
Ngaio Marsh (1895–1982), New Zealand mystery novelist and theatre director
Othniel Charles Marsh (1831–1899), American paleontologist
Ozan Marsh (1920–1992), American concert pianist
Pat Marsh (born 1949), American politician
Pat Marsh (ice hockey) (1933/34–2017), British ice hockey administrator
Paul Marsh (South African cricketer) (born 1939), South African cricketer
PJ Marsh (born 1980), Australian rugby league player
Phil Marsh (born 1986), English footballer
Ralph Warren Marsh (1899–1992), British mycologist and plant pathologist
Randy Marsh (born 1949), Major League baseball umpire
Ray Brent Marsh, mortician responsible for the Tri-State Crematory scandal
Reginald Marsh (disambiguation), several people
Reginald Marsh (artist) (1898–1954), American painter
Reginald Marsh (actor) (1926–2001), English comic actor
Reginald Marsh (cricketer) (1897–1969), English cricketer
Ricardo Marsh (born 1981), American basketball player in Israel
Richard Marsh (disambiguation), several people
Robert Marsh (disambiguation), several people
Robert T. Marsh (1925 - 2017), United States Air Force general
Robert H. Marsh (born 1952), American politician and political aide
Robert James Marsh, mathematician and Whitehead Prize winner
Robert McC. Marsh (1878–1958), American lawyer, politician, and judge
Robert Marsh (cyclist) (born 1968), cyclist from Antigua and Barbuda
Robert Marsh (banker), Governor of the Bank of England, 1762–1764
Robert Burkall Marsh (born 1950), Welsh-born painter in New Zealand
Rod Marsh (1947–2022), Australian cricketer
Rodney Marsh (footballer) (born 1944), English footballer
Sally Ann Marsh, British singer and actress
Samuel Marsh (footballer) (1879–?), English footballer
Samuel Marsh (railroad executive) (1786–1872), American president of Erie Railroad
Samuel Marsh (politician) (c. 1736–1795), London merchant and politician
Selina Tusitala Marsh (born 1971), Pasifika poet–scholar 
Shaun Marsh (born 1983), Australian cricketer
Stanley Marsh 3 (1938–2014), American artist and philanthropist
Terry Marsh (disambiguation), several people
Thomas B. Marsh (1799–1866), leader in the Latter Day Saint movement
Tom Marsh (baseball), American Major League Baseball player
Tom Marsh (Oregon politician), member of the Oregon House of Representatives
Tony Marsh (disambiguation), several people
Vivian Osborne Marsh (1898–1986), American clubwoman
Warne Marsh (1927–1987), American tenor saxophonist
William Henry Marsh, governor of Hong Kong 1882–83 and 1885–87

Fictional
Stan Marsh, a protagonist of South Park
Randy and Sharon Marsh, Stan's parents in South Park
Beverly Marsh, a protagonist of Stephen King's It

English-language surnames